The provisional rosters were published by UNCAF on 19 August 2014. The pre-competition final rosters were released on 1 September 2014.

Each participating team had to register a minimum of 18 and a maximum of 21 players to play in the competition, of which three of those players must be goalkeepers. Teams could replace up to six players in the roster with players on the provisional list of 50 players between the second and third games in the competition.

On 9 September, UNCAF and CONCACAF published changes made by teams following the second game. In total nine players were withdrawn and replaced.

Belize

Head coach:  Leroy Sherrier Lewis

Costa Rica

Head coach:  Paulo Wanchope

Notes

El Salvador

Head coach:  Albert Roca

Guatemala

Head coach:  Iván Franco Sopegno

Honduras

Head coach:  Hernán Medford

Notes

Nicaragua

Head coach:  Enrique Llena

Panama

Head coach:  Hernán Darío Gómez

Notes

References 

Copa Centroamericana squads
squads